Klaudia Medlová (born 26 October 1993 in Liptovský Mikuláš) is a Slovak snowboarder. She won a bronze medal in slopestyle at the FIS Freestyle Ski and Snowboarding World Championships 2015. Also in 2015, she stomped the first female double backside rodeo on a jump during the Nine Queens event in Serfaus-Fiss-Ladis, Austria.

References

External links

Slovak female snowboarders
1993 births
Living people
Snowboarders at the 2018 Winter Olympics
Snowboarders at the 2022 Winter Olympics
Olympic snowboarders of Slovakia
Sportspeople from Liptovský Mikuláš